Sex Appeal is the debut album from Minneapolis, Minnesota native singer-songwriter Georgio.

Reception

Originally released in 1987 on Motown Records.  The album peaked at number 117 on the US pop albums chart and number 27 on the US R&B album chart when it was released.

Track listing 
All songs written and composed by Georgio

Sexappeal  4:33	
Lover's Lane  4:46	
1/4 2 9  4:40	
Menage A Trois  3:38	
Bed Rock	  4:30	
Tina Cherry  4:38	
Hey U  5:17	
I Won't Change  4:04

Charts

Singles

References

External links
 Georgio-Sex Appeal at Discogs

1987 debut albums
Motown albums